Macrargus multesimus is a species of sheetweb spider in the family Linyphiidae. It is found in North America, Europe, a range from Russia (European to Far East), China, and Mongolia.

References

Linyphiidae
Articles created by Qbugbot
Spiders described in 1875
Spiders of North America
Spiders of Europe
Spiders of Russia
Spiders of China